Solitary Man is an original novel based on the US television series Angel.

Plot summary
The widow Mildred Finster has been a fan of "cozy" mystery novels for years. At the age of seventy-one she decides she would like to become a real private detective. She finds a business card for Angel Investigations and likes the name.

Team Angel is busy with its own personal problems, and has little time to deal with Mildred offering her services. Later a truckload of valuable antiquities is stolen and they assume a simple theft. The arrival of ruthless killers from afar soon gets the attention of the gang.

They must cope with being followed everywhere by a well-meaning old lady, fight off poltergeists, and try to set aside their personal differences (at least temporarily) so that they can overcome the supernatural foe which is responsible for a centuries-old mystery.

Continuity
Characters include: Angel, Cordelia, Wesley, Gunn, Fred, and Lorne.

Supposed to be set in Angel season 4.

Canonical issues

Angel books such as this one are not usually considered by fans as canonical. Some fans consider them stories from the imaginations of authors and artists, while other fans consider them to be taking place in an alternative fictional reality. However unlike fan fiction, overviews summarising their story, written early in the writing process, were 'approved' by both Fox and Joss Whedon (or his office), and the books were therefore later published as officially Buffy/Angel merchandise.

External links

Reviews
Litefoot1969.bravepages.com - Review of this book by Litefoot

Angel (1999 TV series) novels
2003 American novels
2003 fantasy novels
Novels by Jeff Mariotte